Nanan may refer to:


Places

India 
 Nanan (Jodhpur), a village in Bilara Tehsil

China
 Nan'an, Fujian (南安市), county-level city of Quanzhou, Fujian
 Nan'an, Dayu County (南安镇), town in Dayu County, Shanxi
 Nan'an, Wenshui County (南安镇), a village in Wenshui County, Shanxi
 Nan'an District (南岸区), Chongqing

People 
 Rangy Nanan (1953–2016), former West Indian cricketer
 Wendy Nanan (born 1955), artist from Trinidad and Tobago